The year 1988 in television involved some significant events. This is a list of notable events in the United States.

Events

Programs

Debuting this year

The following is a list of shows that premiered in 1988.

Resuming this year

Changing networks

Entering syndication
A list of programs (current or canceled) that have accumulated enough episodes (between 65 and 100) or seasons (3 or more) to be eligible for off-network syndication and/or basic cable runs.

Ending this year

Made-for-TV movies and miniseries

Television stations

Station launches

Stations changing network affiliation

Station closures

Notes

Births

Deaths

See also
 1988 in the United States
 List of American films of 1988

References

External links 
List of 1988 American television series at IMDb

 
1980s in American television